The Will is a Nigerian weekly newspaper. It was founded in October 2009 by Austyn Ogannah. It was first published in San Francisco, California before expanding operations into Nigeria. The newspaper, a Nigerian focused publication, covers general news, politics, business, arts, sports, interviews and current affairs. The Will is Published by The Will News Media.

Content and editorial stance
The Will mission is to improve good governance, advocate for social justice, equity and gender rights. The editorial stance of The Will is centre-left. Its editorial piece and cover story published weekly focuses on critical issues around governance and accountability. The paper features a broad mix of news, and carries mainly Nigeria-focused coverage of politics, society and entertainment, sports, tribute, business, opinion, special publication (state of the state), features and editorial. The newspaper is published in two formats; printed as a weekly and an online version which is continuously updated.

Magazine
The Will Downtown magazine was established in 2021 and is a sister publication of The Will newspaper. It is a weekly lifestyle and culture focused insert magazine with interviews and articles about fashion, lifestyle, beauty and wellness. Downtown articles tend to be dominated by pictures and images rather than long-form journalism unlike its parent newspaper, The Will. Downtown magazine has studios in Lagos, Nigeria and Beverly Hills, California.

References

2009 establishments in Nigeria
English-language newspapers published in Africa
Online newspapers published in Nigeria
Newspapers established in 2009
Newspapers published in Lagos
Weekly newspapers published in Nigeria